The Australia cricket team visited Scotland on 3 September 2013 for a one-match One Day International series against the Scotland cricket team at Grange Cricket Club Ground, Raeburn Place, Edinburgh. The match served as a warm-up for Australia ahead of their five-match ODI series against England later in the month. Australia won the match by 200 runs.

Squads

ODI series

Only ODI

References

International cricket competitions in 2013
Scotland 2013